Homaloxestis is a genus of moths in the family Lecithoceridae. The genus was erected by Edward Meyrick in 1910.

Species

Homaloxestis aciformis Liu & Wang, 2014
Homaloxestis aganacma Diakonoff, 1968
Homaloxestis alopecopa Meyrick, 1929
Homaloxestis antibathra Meyrick, 1916
Homaloxestis australis Park, 2004
Homaloxestis baibaraensis Park, 1999
Homaloxestis briantiella (Turati, 1879)
Homaloxestis ceroxesta Meyrick, 1918
Homaloxestis cholopis (Meyrick, 1906)
Homaloxestis cicatrix Gozmány, 1973
Homaloxestis cribanota Meyrick, 1910
Homaloxestis croceata Gozmány, 1978
Homaloxestis eccentropa Meyrick, 1934
Homaloxestis ellipsoidea Liu & Wang, 2014
Homaloxestis endocoma Meyrick, 1910
Homaloxestis furcula Park, 2004
Homaloxestis grabia C. S. Wu & Park, 1999
Homaloxestis hades Gozmány, 1978
Homaloxestis hainanensis C. S. Wu, 1994
Homaloxestis hemigastra Meyrick, 1931
Homaloxestis hesperis Gozmány, 1978
Homaloxestis hilaris Gozmány, 1978
Homaloxestis horochlora Meyrick, 1929
Homaloxestis horridens Gozmány, 1978
Homaloxestis lacerta C. S. Wu & Park, 1999
Homaloxestis liciata Meyrick, 1922
Homaloxestis liochlaena Meyrick, 1931
Homaloxestis lochitis Meyrick, 1918
Homaloxestis luzonensis Park & Byun, 2007
Homaloxestis mucroraphis Gozmány, 1978
Homaloxestis multidentalis Park, 2004
Homaloxestis myeloxesta Meyrick, 1932
Homaloxestis ochrosceles Meyrick, 1910
Homaloxestis orthochlora Meyrick, 1926
Homaloxestis pancrocopa Meyrick, 1937
Homaloxestis perichlora Meyrick, 1910
Homaloxestis plocamandra (Meyrick, 1907)
Homaloxestis pumilis Park, 2004
Homaloxestis quadralis Park & Byun, 2007
Homaloxestis queribunda Meyrick, 1922
Homaloxestis saitoi Park, 2004
Homaloxestis striapunctata (Wu, 1997)
Homaloxestis subpallida Meyrick, 1931
Homaloxestis tenuipalpella (Snellen, 1903)
Homaloxestis turbinata Meyrick, 1910
Homaloxestis vinhphuensis Park, 2007
Homaloxestis xanthocharis Meyrick, 1929
Homaloxestis xylotripta Meyrick, 1918

Former species
Homaloxestis lophophora Janse, 1954

References
 , 1999: Lecithoceridae (Lepidoptera) of Taiwan (I): Subfamily Lecithocerinae: Genera Homaloxestis Meyrick and Lecithocera Herrich-Schäffer. Zoological Studies 38 (2): 238–256. Full article: .
  2004: Genus Homaloxestis Meyrick of Thailand, with description of five new species (Lepidoptera: Lecithoceridae). Journal of Asia-Pacific Entomology 7 (1): 33–43. 
  & , 2007: Review of Homaloxestis Meyrick (Lepidoptera, Lecithoceridae) of the Philippine Islands, with descriptions of two new species. Zootaxa, 1449: 57–64. Full article: .
 , 1999: A review of the Lecithocerinae and Torodorinae (Lepidoptera: Lecithoceridae) in Korea. Insecta Koreana 16 (2): 119–129.
 , 2007: Lecithocerinae (Lepidoptera, Lecithoceridae) of Vietnam I. Genera Homaloxestis Meyrick and Synersaga Gozmány. Journal of Asia-Pacific Entomology 10 (3): 201–209.
 , 1999: Taxonomic review of the Lecithoceridae (Lepidoptera) in Sri Lanka IV.The subfamily Lecithocerinae: genus Lecithocera Herrich-Schäffer and its allies. Insecta Koreana 16 (1): 1-14.

External links

 
Lecithocerinae
Taxa named by Edward Meyrick
Moth genera